Umeå Airport  is an airport located on the southern outskirts of the city of Umeå, Sweden. As of 2019, it is the seventh-largest airport in Sweden. It had 960,351 passengers in 2019.

History
The airport was inaugurated in May 1962, but had its first flight in 1961.

Airlines and destinations

Passenger

Cargo

Statistics

Accidents and incidents
On 21 September 1992, an Air Sweden IAI-1124 Westwind registered as SE-DLK was destroyed by a fire. The plane was departing to Arvidsjaur when takeoff was aborted due to an engine failure. None of the seven occupants were killed or injured, but the aircraft was written off.

 On 14 July 2019, a GippsAero GA8 Airvan aircraft with crew and skydivers lost control and crashed steeply into the ground. It had taken off from Umeå Airport. All nine on board died.

See also
List of the largest airports in the Nordic countries

References

External links

Airports in Sweden
Umeå
Buildings and structures in Umeå
International airports in Sweden